The 15th Pan American Games were held in Rio de Janeiro, Brazil, between 13 July 2007 and 29 July 2007. The Antiguan and Barbudan delegation had 9 athletes (8 men and 1 woman), participating in 3 sports and winning its first ever gold medal at the Pan American Games.

Medals

Athletics

Men

Women

See also
Antigua and Barbuda at the 2006 Commonwealth Games
Antigua and Barbuda at the 2008 Summer Olympics

External links
Athletes of Antigua & Barbuda in 2007 Pan American Games

Nations at the 2007 Pan American Games
Pan American Games
2007